The Department of Parliamentary Affairs is an Uttar Pradesh government department. It is headed by state Cabinet Minister of Parliamentary Affairs.

It has the role of handling affairs related to the legislature of the state and works as a link between both the houses of the legislature, the Vidhan Sabha (Legislative Assembly) and the Vidhan Parishad (Legislative Council).

Currently, Suresh Kumar Khanna, MLA from the Shahjahanpur constituency is serving as the Cabinet Minister of Parliamentary Affairs since March 2017. Mayankeshwar Sharan Singh is serving as the Minister of State for Parliamentary Affairs since March 2022.

List of Cabinet Ministers 

Source:

See also 

 Uttar Pradesh Government
 Suresh Kumar Khanna
 Second Yogi Adityanath ministry

References 

Government departments of Uttar Pradesh